Thiolactones are a class of heterocyclic compounds in organic chemistry.  They are analogs of the more common lactones in which an oxygen atom is replaced with a sulfur atom.  The sulfur atom is within the ring system and adjacent to a carbonyl group.

Chemistry
Thiolactones can be prepared by dehydration of thiol-containing carboxylic acids.  Thiolactones can be hydrolyzed back to the thiol acids under basic conditions. β-Thiolactones can be opened by reaction at the 4-position via SN2 nucleophilic reactions.

Occurrence
The most common thiolactone, homocysteine thiolactone is produced biochemically from homocysteine and it may play a role in protein damage. The thiolactone functional group is also present in some pharmaceutical drugs such as citiolone and erdosteine. Thiolactone rings can also be found in peptides synthesized by bacteria such as Staphylococcus aureus in order to regulate their quorum-sensing system.

See also
Lactone
Lactam

References

Functional groups